Killings is a short story written by Andre Dubus in 1979. The short story entails how a man seeks revenge after the murder of his son.  In 2001, the story was adapted into Todd Field's film, In the Bedroom. The film starred Sissy Spacek, Tom Wilkinson, and Marisa Tomei, and was nominated for five Academy Awards – Best Picture, Actor in a Leading Role (Wilkinson), Actress in a Leading Role (Spacek), Actress in a Supporting Role (Tomei), and Best Writing, Screenplay Based on Material Previously Published (Robert Festinger & Field). After the film's release the story was republished in a collection called "In the Bedroom" for which Field wrote the preface.

The work deals with the emotional struggle that the main character, Matt Fowler, encounters as he is forced to confront the killer of his son.

References

1979 short stories
American short stories
Short stories adapted into films